The 1988 Winnipeg Blue Bombers finished in 2nd place in the East Division with a 9–9 record. They won the Grey Cup 22–21 over the favoured BC Lions, becoming the first team ever to win the Grey Cup with only a .500 record.

Offseason

CFL Draft

Preseason

Regular season

Standings

Schedule

Playoffs

East Semi-Final

East Final

Grey Cup

Awards

1988 CFL All-Stars

References

James S. Dixon Trophy championship seasons
Grey Cup championship seasons
1988 Canadian Football League season by team